Procalyptis oncota is a species of moth of the family Tortricidae. It is found in Australia, where it has been recorded from Western Australia.

References

	

Moths described in 1910
Archipini